David Brodie may refer to:

 David Brodie (field hockey) (1910–1996), British Olympic field hockey player
 David Brodie (political strategist) (born 1974), senior organizer for the Liberal Party of Canada
 David Brodie (racing driver) (born 1943), British auto racing driver
 David Brodie (Royal Navy officer) (1709–1787), captain in the Royal Navy
 David A. Brodie (1867–1951), American football coach at Washington State University

See also
 David Brody (disambiguation)